Geoffrey Dinsdale (born 24 July 1942) is a British retired slalom canoeist who competed in the 1960s and 1970s. He won a bronze medal in the folding K-1 team event at the 1963 in Spittal. Dinsdale also finished 21st in the C-1 event at the 1972 Summer Olympics in Munich.

References

British male canoeists
1942 births
Canoeists at the 1972 Summer Olympics
Living people
Olympic canoeists of Great Britain
Place of birth missing (living people)
Medalists at the ICF Canoe Slalom World Championships